Death-associated protein kinase 2 is an enzyme that in humans is encoded by the DAPK2 gene.

This gene encodes a protein that belongs to the serine/threonine protein kinase family. This protein contains a N-terminal protein kinase domain followed by a conserved calmodulin-binding domain with significant similarity to that of death-associated protein kinase 1 (DAPK1), a positive regulator of programmed cell death. Overexpression of this gene was shown to induce cell apoptosis.  It uses multiple polyadenylation sites. The DAPK2 mRNA may undergo alternative splicing to produce a DAPK3-like encoding transcript.

References

Further reading

EC 2.7.11